1. FC Saarbrücken II is the reserve team of German association football club 1. FC Saarbrücken, based in Saarbrücken, Saarland. Historically, until 2005, the team played as 1. FC Saarbrücken Amateure during the times the senior team played in professional football.

The team reached the first round of the DFB-Pokal, the German Cup, just once, in 2002–03. The team has played as high as the Oberliga Rheinland-Pfalz/Saar, courtesy to league titles in the Verbandsliga Saarland, than the highest football league in the state.

History
The team first made an appearance in the Ehrenliga Saarland from 1948 to 1951 in place of the senior team which played, for a season, in the French second division and, after that, in a friendlies competition.

After a lengthy absence from the top division of the state it made a reappearance in 1986, now in the tier four Verbandsliga Saarland and won the league two seasons later in 1988. Nine seasons in the Oberliga Südwest, now the Oberliga Rheinland-Pfalz/Saar followed. The team was relegated from the Oberliga in 1997, 2001 and 2007 to return each time a short while later. In 2002 it won the Saarland Cup for the first and only time thereby qualifying for the first round of the 2002–03 German Cup where it lost to Arminia Bielefeld.

1. FC Saarbrücken II last played at Oberliga level since the last promotion in 2010, achieving a fourth-place finish as its best-ever result in 2013. At the end of the 2014–15 season the team was withdrawn by the club from competitive football, but was recreated in 2018, restarting in the tenth-division Kreisliga A.

Honours
The team's honours:
 Ehrenliga Saarland 
 Champions: 1951
 Verbandsliga Saarland
 Champions: (3) 1988, 1998, 2010
 Runners-up: (2) 1987, 2002
 Saarland Cup
 Winners: 2002
 Runners-up: 2005

Recent seasons
The recent season-by-season performance of the team:

 With the introduction of the Regionalligas in 1994 and the 3. Liga in 2008 as the new third tier, below the 2. Bundesliga, all leagues below dropped one tier.

Key

References

External links
 Official website 
 1. FC Saarbrücken II at Weltfussball.de 

II
German reserve football teams
Football clubs in Saarland
Saarland reserve football teams